Injuries in rock climbing may occur due to falls, or due to overuse (see Sports injury). Injuries due to falls are relatively uncommon; the vast majority of injuries result from overuse, most often occurring in the fingers, elbows, and shoulders. Such injuries are often no worse than torn calluses, cuts, burns and bruises. However, overuse symptoms, if ignored, may lead to permanent damage (esp. to tendons, tendon sheaths, ligaments, and joint capsules).

Risk groups
The climbers most prone to injuries are intermediate to expert within lead climbing or bouldering.

Overuse injuries in climbing
In terms of overuse injuries a British study found that:
 40% occurred in the fingers
 16% in the shoulders
 12% in the elbows
 5% in the knees
 5% in the back
 4% in the wrists

One injury that tend to be very common among climbers is Carpal tunnel syndrome. It is found in about 25% of climbers.

Finger injuries 
604 injured rock climbers were prospectively evaluated from January 1998 to December 2001, due to the rapid growth of new complex finger trauma in the mid-1980s. Of the most frequent injuries, three out of four were related to the fingers: pulley injuries accounted for 20%, tendovaginitis for 7%, and joint capsular damage for 6.1%.

Pulleys 
Damage to the flexor tendon pulleys that encircle and support the tendons that cross the finger joints is the most common finger injury within the sport (see climber's finger).
The main culprit for pulley related injuries is the common crimp grip, especially in the closed position. The crimp grip requires a near ninety-degree flexion of the middle finger joint, which produces a tremendous force load on the A2 pulley. Injuries to the A2 pulley can range from microscopic to partial tears and, in the worst case, complete ruptures. Some climbers report hearing a pop, which might be a sign of a significant tear or complete rupture, during an extremely heavy move (e.g. tiny crimp, one- or two-finger pocket). Small partial tears, or inflammation can occur over the course of several sessions.
 Grade I – Sprain of the finger ligaments (collateral ligaments), pain locally at the pulley, pain when squeezing or climbing.
 Grade II – Partial rupture of the pulley tendon. Pain locally at the pulley, pain when squeezing or climbing, possible pain while extending your finger.
 Grade III – Complete rupture of the pulley, causing bowstringing of the tendon. Symptoms can include: Pain locally at the pulley (usually sharp), may feel/hear a 'pop' or 'crack', swelling and possible bruising, pain when squeezing or climbing, pain when extending your finger, pain with resisted flexion of the finger.

Knuckle 
 Stress fractures
 Collateral ligament injuries

Shoulder injuries 
Shoulder related injuries include rotator cuff tear, strain or tendinitis, biceps tendinitis and SLAP lesion.

Elbow injuries 
Tennis elbow (Lateral Epicondylitis) is a common elbow injury among climbers, as is Golfer's elbow (Medial Epicondylitis, which is similar,  but occurs on the inside of the elbow).

Calluses, dry skin
Climbers often develop calluses on their fingers from regular contact with the rock and the rope. When calluses split open they expose a raw layer of skin that can be very painful. This type of injury is commonly referred to as a flapper.

The use of magnesium carbonate (chalk) for better grip dries out the skin and can often lead to cracked and damaged hands 

There are a number of skincare products available for climbers that help to treat calluses, moisturise dry hands and reduce recovery time.

Young/adolescent climbers
"Any finger injury that is sustained by a young adolescent (12–16) should be seen by a physician and have x-rays performed. These skeletally immature athletes are very susceptible to developing debilitating joint arthritis later in adulthood."

See also
 Related topics
 Carpal tunnel syndrome
 Climber's finger
 Golfer's elbow
 Repetitive strain injury
 Radial tunnel syndrome
 Tennis elbow
 Lists and glossaries
 List of climbing topics
 Climbing terminology
 Climbing command

References 

Climbing and health
Overuse injuries
Sports medicine
Inflammations
Soft tissue disorders